Errol Anthony Stevens (born 9 May 1986) is a Jamaican former footballer who played as a forward.

Career

Harbour View 
Stevens is a powerful forward, who also possesses decent pace and technique. Having previously played for his homeland side Harbour View, in July 2009 he decided to depart the island on trials, looking for the opportunity to impress in Europe.

FC Khimki 
He signed for Russian Premier League side FC Khimki on 20 August 2009 until the end of the season. Stevens made his debut on 22 August against PFC CSKA Moscow. He returned to Harbour View at the end of the 2009 Russian Premier League season.

Arnett Gardens 
Stevens moved to Arnett Gardens for the 2011–12 season. Where he led the team to the Claro Champions League, scoring 6 goals in 5 games and was voted MVP of the Competition.

Hải Phòng
In December 2014, Stevens signed with V.League 1 side Hải Phòng.

International 
After he had already trained with the Reggae Boyz in 2007, Stevens made his international senior debut on 6 September 2011 versus Colombia in Fort Lauderdale, Florida. Although he impressed the technical staff, Jamaica lost the match 2–0.

References

External links
 
  Errol Stevens at Footballdatabase

1986 births
Sportspeople from Kingston, Jamaica
Living people
Jamaican footballers
Jamaica international footballers
Association football forwards
Harbour View F.C. players
FC Khimki players
Tivoli Gardens F.C. players
Portmore United F.C. players
Arnett Gardens F.C. players
Errol Stevens
Dunbeholden F.C. players
Haiphong FC players
Thanh Hóa FC players
National Premier League players
Russian Premier League players
V.League 1 players
Jamaican expatriate footballers
Expatriate footballers in Russia
Jamaican expatriate sportspeople in Russia
Expatriate footballers in Thailand
Jamaican expatriate sportspeople in Thailand
Expatriate footballers in Vietnam
Jamaican expatriate sportspeople in Vietnam